Dennis Rosin (born 27 June 1996) is a German professional footballer who plays as a midfielder for SV Drochtersen/Assel.

Career
In June 2017, Rosin joined the Werder Bremen reserves. In May 2018, following Werder Bremen II's relegation from the 3. Liga, it was announced Rosin would be one of ten players to leave the club.

In August 2020, Rosin moved to Regionalliga Nord side Altona 93.

References

External links
 
 

Living people
1996 births
Footballers from Hamburg
Association football midfielders
German footballers
2. Bundesliga players
3. Liga players
Regionalliga players
FC St. Pauli players
SV Werder Bremen II players
Sportfreunde Lotte players
SV Elversberg players
VfB Oldenburg players
Altonaer FC von 1893 players
SV Drochtersen/Assel players